Neha Singh, known by her stage name Pavitra Punia (born 22 April 1986), is an Indian actress. She is known for playing Geet Dhillon in Love U Zindagi and an evil queen named Timnasa in the sitcom fantasy series Baalveer Returns. She participated in the reality shows MTV Splitsvilla 3 in 2009 and Bigg Boss 14 in 2020.

Career 
Pavitra Punia started her career with the MTV's reality show MTV Splitsvilla 3
In 2010, she made her acting debut with the show Geet – Hui Sabse Parayi playing the role of Dalljiet. Thereafter, she got her first lead role in the Star Plus's show Love U Zindagi, opposite Sidharth Shukla. She was also a part of the Life OK's reality show Welcome – Baazi Mehmaan Nawazi Ki.

She then acted in the Mukul Mishra-directed movie Siddhartha - Love, Lust, Peace, which stars Mahesh Bhatt, Shivam Bhargava and Shazahn Padamsee. Punia has also been a part of other shows including Ritz Jeele Yeh Pal, MTV Making The Cut 2, Hongey Judaa Na Hum, Sawaare Sabke Sapne Preeto and Darr Sabko Lagta Hai. She portrayed the role of the lead antagonist Niddhi Chhabra in the Star Plus's show Yeh Hai Mohabbatein. She also played the role of Karuna in TV's Gangaa. She also played a shape-shifting snake for a maha episode in Zee Tv's Kaleerein. Then she played Poulomi Roy in Colors TV's Naagin 3. she portrayed the role of an evil queen named Timnasa in Sony SAB's sitcom fantasy series Baalveer Returns.

In October 2020, Punia entered the Bigg Boss Season 14 house as a contestant. She was evicted from the show on day 57.

Personal life
In 2020, she started dating her Bigg Boss 14  fellow contestant Eijaz Khan.

Filmography

Films 
 Siddhartha: Love, Lust, Peace

Television

References

External links 

 
 

21st-century Indian actresses
Actresses from Uttar Pradesh
Actresses in Hindi television
Bigg Boss (Hindi TV series) contestants
Female models from Uttar Pradesh
Indian soap opera actresses
Indian television actresses
Living people
Participants in Indian reality television series
People from Bagpat district
Place of birth missing (living people)
1986 births